Antonio Nieves Martín (born 2 December 1989),  commonly known as Maikel Nieves is a Spanish footballer who plays for Norwegian club Råde  as a forward.

Club career
Born in Las Palmas, Nieves started his youth career with the academy of CD Yoñe before passing through the youth setups of UD Telde and UD Las Palmas. Subsequently, he went to play for lower league clubs in his native country, representing UD Vecindario and Rayo Cantabria.

In April 2014, Nieves moved abroad for the first time and signed with Norwegian third-tier club Nybergsund IL-Trysil. In his first season abroad, he contributed with 16 goals ans 11 assists. He moved to Kongsvinger IL Toppfotball in December. He contributed with 11 goals in his first season with the club, with his team winning promotion to the second tier. He went on to play regularly with the club, and also featured for the side in the 2016 Norwegian Football Cup final. After amassing 85 caps and scoring 30 goals, Nieves left the club in December 2017.

On 8 January 2018, Nieves switched to Swedish Allsvenskan club IF Brommapojkarna. In January 2019, Nieves signed with Fredrikstad FK in the Norwegian 2. divisjon.

Career statistics

References

External links

1989 births
Living people
Association football forwards
Spanish footballers
Segunda División B players
Tercera División players
UD Las Palmas Atlético players
UD Vecindario players
Norwegian First Division players
Norwegian Second Division players
Nybergsund IL players
Kongsvinger IL Toppfotball players
Allsvenskan players
IF Brommapojkarna players
Fredrikstad FK players
Spanish expatriate footballers
Expatriate footballers in Norway
Spanish expatriate sportspeople in Norway
Expatriate footballers in Sweden
Spanish expatriate sportspeople in Sweden